"The Mirror" is episode 71 of the American television anthology series The Twilight Zone, and the sixth episode of the third season. It originally aired on October 20, 1961 on CBS. The episode was written by Rod Serling, who described it as "the story of a tyrant and his assassins, a shattered dream and the death of a cause."

Opening narration

Plot
In a Central American dictatorship, Ramos Clemente and his four lifelong confidants, Cristo, D'Alessandro, Tabal, and Garcia, stage a successful revolution against the regime of General De Cruz. Clemente faces down De Cruz and revels in his victory, but the deposed general says that Clemente will soon learn the consequences of ruling by force and that his ornate mirror has the ability to reveal enemies in its reflection, though Clemente dismisses the latter.

When Clemente begins using the same repressive tactics used by De Cruz, a rift develops between him and his friends, now government heads. When Clemente looks into the mirror, he sees visions implying that all four of his confidantes are plotting to assassinate him. Clemente believes that the mirror reflects their true thoughts and accuses them of their supposed future crimes. A particular point of contention is Clemente's order for two of his confidants to conduct mass executions of prisoners he has declared to be enemies of the state. When one confidant reaproaches Clemente, Clemente kills him by throwing him off a balcony; two others are shot by Clemente's orders and the last is shot by Clemente.

Sometime later, Clemente is approached by a priest named Father Tomas, who asks him to end the executions which have been going on for a week. Clemente refuses, saying that as long as he has enemies, the executions will continue. Eventually however, Clemente seeks counsel from the priest, but finds no comfort in the priest's response that all tyrants have but one real enemy, whom they never recognize until it is too late. Clemente takes one more look in the mirror and sees only himself. He picks up his pistol and throws it at the mirror, smashing the glass. The priest, standing outside Clemente's office, hears the glass break. As he listens at the door, he hears a gunshot. He rushes into Clemente's office and finds Clemente's lifeless body sprawled on the floor, killed by his own gun as it fell to the floor. "The last assassin," he says, "and they never learn. They never seem to learn."

Closing narration

Cast
 Peter Falk as Ramos Clemente
 Will Kuluva as General De Cruz
 Richard Karlan as D'Alessandro 
 Vladimir Sokoloff as Father Tomas
 Antony Carbone as Cristo
 Rodolfo Hoyos Jr. (credited as Rodolfo Hoyos) as Garcia
 Arthur Batanides as Tabal

References
DeVoe, Bill. (2008). Trivia from The Twilight Zone. Albany, GA: Bear Manor Media. 
Grams, Martin. (2008). The Twilight Zone: Unlocking the Door to a Television Classic. Churchville, MD: OTR Publishing.

External links

1961 American television episodes
Cuban Revolution in fiction
Television episodes about communism
Television episodes written by Rod Serling
The Twilight Zone (1959 TV series season 3) episodes